Bajaur District is a district in Malakand Division of Khyber Pakhtunkhwa province in Pakistan. Until 2018, it was an agency of the Federally Administered Tribal Areas, then during restructuring that merged FATA with Khyber Pakhtunkhwa, it became a district. According to the 2017 census, the population of the district is 1,093,684. It borders Afghanistan's Kunar Province with a 52 km border. The headquarters of the agency administration is located in the town of Khar.

Geography
It lies at a high elevation to the east of the Kunar Valley of Afghanistan and Pakistan, from which it is separated by a continuous line of rugged frontier hills, forming a barrier that is easily passable at one or two points. The old road from Kabul to Pakistan ran through the barrier before the Khyber Pass was adopted as the main route. Nawagai is the chief town of Bajour; the Khan of Nawagai was previously under British protection for the purpose of safeguarding of the Chitral road.

To the south of Bajaur District is the wild mountain district of the Mohmand District. To the east, beyond the Panjkora River, are the hills of Swat District, dominated by another Pashtun group. To the north is an intervening watershed between Bajaur and the small tehsil of Dir. It is over this watershed and through the valley of Dir, that the new road from Malakand and the Punjab runs to Chitral.

An interesting feature in the topography is a mountain spur from the Kunar range.

The drainage of Bajaur flows eastwards, starting from the eastern slopes of the dividing ridge, which overlooks the Kunar and terminating in the Panjkora river, so that the district lies on a slope tilting gradually downwards from the Kunar ridge to the Panjkora.

Jandol, one of the northern valleys of Bajour, has ceased to be of political importance since the 19th century, when a previous chief, Umra Khan, failed to appropriate himself Bajour, Dir and a great part of the Kunar valley. It was the active hostility between the amir of Kabul (who claimed sovereignty of the same districts) and Umra Khan that led, firstly to the demarcation agreement of 1893 which fixed the boundary of Afghanistan in Kunar; and, secondly, to the invasion of Chitral by Umra Khan (who was no party to the boundary settlement), and the siege of the Chitral fort in 1895.

History

Ancient history
The area was the site of the ancient Scythian kingdom of Apraca from the 1st century BCE to the 1st century CE, and a stronghold of the Aspasioi, a western branch of the Ashvakas (q.v) of the Sanskrit texts who had earlier offered stubborn resistance to the Macedonian invader Alexander the Great in 326 BCE. The whole region came under Kushan control after the conquests of Kujula Kadphises during the first century CE.

Alexander the Great

Alexander turned south from Aornus and continued march towards the Indus, but the greatest surprise during the march came when he neared the town of Nysa (former name of Bajaur). The local people and even the flora seemed strangely out of place in these mountains. The Nysains placed their dead in cedar coffin in the trees - some of which Alexander accidentally set on fire - and made wine from grapes, unlike other tribes in the area. The Acuphis, the chief man of the city, who has been sent to them along with other thirty leaders, begged him not to harm their towns as they were descendants of settlers that the god Dionysus placed their generation before. Their prolific ivy, a plant sacred to Dionysus that nowhere else in the mountain, was proof they were the people blessed by god. Then they were only commanded to give him 300 cavalry, after which he restored their freedom and allow them to live under their own laws, having made acuphis governor of the city. Alexander took his son and grandson as hostages. He sacrificed there to Bacchus under this god’s others name of Dionysus.

Bajaur casket

The Bajaur casket, also called the Indravarma reliquary, year 63, or sometimes referred to as the Avaca inscription, is an ancient reliquary from the area of Bajaur in ancient Gandhara, in the present-day Federally Administered Tribal Areas of Pakistan. It is dated to around 5-6 CE. It proves the involvement of the Scythian kings of the Apraca, in particular King Indravarman, in Buddhism. The casket is made of schist.

Babur's attack on Bajaur

In 1518, Babur had invested and conquered the fortress of Bajaur, The Gabar-Kot from Sultan Mir Haider Ali Gabari the Jahangirian Sultan and gone on to conquer Bhera on the river Jhelum, a little beyond the salt ranges. Babur claimed these areas as his own, because they had been part of Taimur's empire. Hence, "picturing as our own the countries once occupied by the Turks", he ordered that "there was to be no overrunning or plundering [of the countryside]". It may be noted that this applied to areas which did not offer resistance, because earlier, at Bajaur, where the Pashtun tribesmen had resisted, he had ordered a general massacare, with their women and children being made captive.

Babur justifies this massacre by saying, "the Bajauris were rebels and at enmity with the people of Islam, and as, by heathenish and hostile customs prevailing in their midst, the very name of Islam was rooted out...".

As the Bajauris were rebels and inimical to the people of Islam, the men were subjected to a general massacre and their wives and children were made captive. At a guess, more than 3,000 men met their death. We entered the fort and inspected it. On the walls, in houses, streets and alleys, the dead lay, in what numbers! Those walking around had to jump over the corpses.

Recent decades
During the Soviet invasion in the 1980s, the area was a critical staging ground for Afghan and local mujahideen to organise and conduct raids. It still hosts a large population of Afghan refugees sympathetic to Gulbuddin Hekmatyar, a mujahideen leader ideologically close to the Arab militants. Today, the United States believes militants based in Bajaur launch frequent attacks on American and Afghan troops in Afghanistan.}

In 2001 to 2007, a person named Marvan was in a truck (Datsun), in Loi sum checkpoint, they inquired of him that who is he? On that, he jumped from the truck, run away and started firing. The militants were trying to capture him, after 5–6 miles running, firing, they encountered him. Local people were saying that a great Mujahid was martyred, fragrant smell was coming from his blood. After his death, a breakout of Talibanization occurred. then the government were shifted from military to Taliban in this area. this change was slowly and gradually, Taliban target the checkpoints, firstly from peripheral areas and then in central areas. Then they targeted the schools, government servants, retired soldiers, all those people who had some relation with government. They made their own rules, Like no one will shave, wearing caps etc.

Damadola Airstrike
An aerial attack, executed by the United States targeting Ayman al-Zawahiri, took place in a village in Bajaur Agency on January 13, 2006, killing 18 people. Al-Zawahiri was not found among the dead and the incident led to severe outrage in the area.

Chenagai Airstrike
On October 30, 2006, 80 people were killed in Bajaur when Pakistani forces attacked a religious school they said was being used as a militant training camp. There are many unconfirmed reports that the October attack was also carried out by the United States or NATO forces, but was claimed by Islamabad over fears of widespread protest similar to those after the US bombing in January 2006. Maulana Liaqat, the head of the seminary, was killed in the attack. Liaqat was a senior leader of the pro-Taliban movement Tanzim Nifaz Shariat Mohammadi (TNSM), that spearheaded a violent Islamic movement in Bajaur and the neighbouring Malakand areas in 1994. The TNSM had led some 5,000 men from the Pakistani areas of Dir, Swat and Bajaur across the Mamond border into Afghanistan in October 2001, to fight US-led troops. In what is thought to be a reprisal for the October strike in Bajaur, in November, a suicide bomber killed dozens in an attack on an army training school in Khyber-Pakhtunkhwa.

Loi sum is on a strategic location, road come from four sides, (khar, Nawagi, Tangai and Inzari), so approach was easy from Charmang and Ambar. That was the reason that this area was affected mostly. A military offensive by the military of Pakistan (FC and Leaves) was launched in early 8 August 2008 to retake the border crossing near the town of Loi-Sum, 12 km from khar from militants loyal to Tehrik-e-Taliban, the so-called Pakistani Taliban. In the two weeks following the initial battle, government forces pulled back to Khar and initiated aerial bombing and artillery barrages on presumed militant positions, which reportedly has all but depopulated Bajaur and parts of neighbouring Mohmand Agency, with an estimated 300,000 fleeing their homes. The estimate of casualties ran into the hundreds. The offensive was launched in the wake of Prime Minister Yousuf Raza Gilani's visit to Washington in late July, and is believed by some to be in response to U.S. demands that Pakistan prevent the FATA being used as a safe haven by insurgents fighting American and NATO troops in Afghanistan. However, the offensive was decided by the military, not the civilian government. The bloody bombing of Pakistan Ordnance Factories in Wah on August 21, 2008, came according to Maulvi Omar, a spokesman for the Pakistani Taliban, as a response to the Bajaur offensive. after a few weeks, the Pak army came to battlefield. In an initial way toward the Loi sum Taliban did not resist and let them to come to middle position, when they reach to Rashakai, (3–4 km from Loi sum)  Talaiban started to attack them but the Army was far stronger than their expectation. For several weeks they stayed in Rashakai, then 1st attempt Army come to loi sum, stay for whole day and come back to Rashakai, In 2nd attempt was the same, and 3rd attempt they come to loi sum and took the control of the area. Army continues there journey, control the main road of Bajaur from Khar to Nawagi, and the peripheral areas were still in the hold of Taliban. After nine months of vigorous clashes between government security forces and Taliban, military forces have finally claimed to have forced militants out of Bajaur Agency, and advanced towards strongholds of Taliban in the region. According to figures provided by the Government of Pakistan, 1,600 militants were killed and more than 2,000 injured, while some 150 civilians also died and about 2,000 were injured in the fighting. The military operation forced more than 300,000 people to flee their homes and take shelter in IDP camps in settled districts of the province. To date, more than 180,000 IDPs have returned to their homes in Bajaur Agency, facing widespread destruction to their lives, livelihoods and massive unemployment.
In August, 2012, the Pakistani Army de-notified Bajaur as conflict zone.

Administrative divisions
Bajaur District is currently subdivided into seven Tehsils or Sub-divisions:

 Bar Chamer Kand Tehsil
 Barang Tehsil
 Khar Tehsil
 Mamund Tehsil
 Nawagai
 Salarzai Tehsil
 Utmankhel Tehsil

Tribes

Bajaur is inhabited almost exclusively by Tarkani (Tarkalani) Pashtuns, and there are their main sub-tribes in Bajaur: Utmankhel, Tarkalanri (Mamund, Kakazai, Wur and Salarzai) as well as a small population of Safis. The Utmankhel are at the southeast of Bajaur, while Mamund are at the southwest, and the Tarkani are at the north of Bajaur. Its border with Afghanistan's Kunar province makes it of strategic importance to Pakistan and the region. Gujar are also present.

Demographics 
At the time of the 2017 census the district had a population of 1,090,987, of which 556,036 were males and 534,895 females. The entire population was rural. The literacy rate was 29.93% - the male literacy rate was 48.65% while the female literacy rate was 10.97%. 348 people in the district were from religious minorities. Pashto was the predominant language, spoken by 99.21% of the population.

Parliament Members

National Assembly

NA-40 (old NA-43 upto 2018)

NA-41 (Old NA-44 upto 2018)

Provincial Assembly

Education
In Bajaur, the total number of SSC-level schools registered with Malakand Board are 814 (419 government-run, 395 private-run). The number of HSSC-level colleges are 368 (170 government-run, 198 private-run).

Education Problems

 the total papolation  af bajour is 6 lack 
 total schools is 106
 total college is 11
 shortage of schools and college

Education Rank
In district school education rank of Pakistan, the position of is going downward, according to the Alif Ailaan ranking, the rank of Bajaur in 2014, 2015 and 2016 is the following

Tourism 
Bajaur is located near swat and  District Dir, so the climates of these districts are comparatively same.

Koh-i-Mor 
Koh-i-Mor is the highest peak in Bajaur. It is also called three peak mountain. Its top is covered with snow in winter and clouds are touching its peak. The peak of Koh-i-Mor is visible from the Peshawar valley when there is no clouds or Haze.

It is an historical mountain, its history is found two thousands year back, here at the foot of the Koh-i-mor mountain, that Alexander the Great founded the ancient city of Nysa and the Nysaean colony, traditionally said to have been founded by Dionysus. The Koh-i-Mor has been identified as the Meros of Arrian's history—the three-peaked mountain from which the god issued

For hiking,  like Jahaz Banda and Fairy meadow, kon-I-mor is the best, it is about four hours trekking non-local and two and a half for locals. On the way you will see a lot of variation. In some places you will pass through thick forest of fine trees, some places have shrubs, and some place you will see some different kinds of trees.

People are living in koh-i-mor up-to near the top. These people have simple houses with a single room, there is no extra boundary wall. Rooms are made like caves in mountain. Majority of them are shepherds.

Chenarran (platane Orientalis)
At the base of Koh-i-Mor a lot of chenar trees along with spring. Locals people are coming here and enjoy the nature, making their own cooking, some have load speakers, music, etc. majority people come along with their families.

Gabar Chenna
It is situated in Tehsil Salarzai, it has snowy water, people are come from all over the Bajaur and DIR to enjoy it especially in Ramadan and Eids. 
It is a historically spring, once here was a undefeated king ....

Charmang Hill
The Charmang hills in Bajaur are covered with pine trees and also the roads is made up to top of hill. The road goes on top of hill from bottom to top.  In winter, the whole mountain is covered with snow for months.

Raghagan DAM
Raghagan Dam is situated in Tehsil Salarzai. It a tourist spot nowadays. Boats are present here for tourists.

Economy

Agriculture
Bajaur is a semi-independent in agriculture field, The soil is fertile but the no proper irrigation system. 
Harvest Crops;
People grow wheat, maze and rices in some areas. All the crops is mainly dependent on rain.
Vegetable and Fruits;
The different types of vegetables are growing in Bajaur. Potato, tomato, onion, lady fingers, spinach, and orange parsimon, etc

Marble
Marbles are found in various regions, mainly in Inzari and Nawagai. There are different types of marble supper white, Badle etc. In the local areas are marble factories, cut to into different sizes of the base of demand, and supply to all over the country and even abroad.

Marble factory
The marble cutting factories are found in Shaikh kali and Umary. The supply to the factories of marble mainly from the local mountains and they also bring the marble from ambar and Zairat. These different types and variety of marble then supply all over the country

Nephrite
Nephrite (jade) is the precious stone, Rs 3000–5000 per kg. The mines are found in Inzari and some area in Utmankhail tehsil. It exports mainly to China, The Chinese thought so too, and for thousands of years, nephrite articles had a special value and signature and skilled artisans carved increasingly intricate designs. Maybe because it was so rare in China, yet useful for its toughness, nephrite became the status symbol of the rulers, considered imperial stone.

Olives and olive oil 
The KPK government has started olive production projects in the Bajaur district. Previously, many wild olive trees are present in the area having no such importance. They use agricultural techniques to convert these wild trees into more farmer friendly and productive plants. With new projects of planting olive trees on more than 150000 acres of land, the Bajaur district will be the olive hub of Pakistan. Moreover, the district administration has installed olive oil extraction machine for locals. this machine started producing olive oil this year. More than 200 kg of oil has been extracted which is just a beginning. In coming years you will see huge transformation. These projects will change the fate and economical status of the district. The locals will have more new employment opportunities cause reduction in unemployment in the tribal area.

See also 
Bajaur Campaign
Damadola airstrike of January 13, 2006
Chenagai airstrike of October 30, 2006
Bajaur offensive
Kakazai
Salarzai

Notes

References

References

Profiles of Pakistan's Seven Tribal Agencies

Attribution

 
Districts of Khyber Pakhtunkhwa